Jharkhand Football Association (JFA) is the state governing body of football in Jharkhand. It is affiliated with the All India Football Federation, the national governing body.

References

Football in Jharkhand
Football governing bodies in India
Sports organizations established in 2000
2000 establishments in Jharkhand